Nightmare in New Orleans is a Nancy Drew and Hardy Boys Supermystery crossover novel, published in 1997.

Plot summary
The Royal Creole, a Creole restaurant in New Orleans, Louisiana, is opened for business by Shelly and Remy Maspero. Nancy Drew heads up there to congratulate her friends, but ends up trying to figure out the strange mishaps that have arisen there. Meanwhile, the Hardys are there too, trying to uncover the facts behind a million-dollar heist in a riverboat casino, and the facts suggest that Remy Maspero is the culprit. With time running out the threesome will have to solve the case.

References

External links
Nightmare in New Orleans at Fantastic Fiction
Supermystery series books

Supermystery
1997 American novels
1997 children's books
Novels set in New Orleans